The Supreme Electoral Court (TSE) is the highest electoral authority in the country of El Salvador.

Composition 
Article 208 of the Constitution of El Salvador establishes that "there will be a Supreme Electoral Court which will be formed of five Judges, who will remain on the Court for five years and will be chosen by the Legislative Assembly", and that "three of the Judges will each come from one of the three political parties or coalitions who obtained the greatest number of votes in the last presidential election". The two remaining judges are chosen from two slates of judges with no political affiliation proposed by the Supreme Court.

2019-2024 term 
On 30 July 2019, the members of the Supreme Electoral Court for the period 2019-2024 were announced as per below.

History

Central Electoral Council 
The 1950 constitution of El Salvador established a Central Electoral Council (CCE) as the "highest authority of electoral matters". It was formed of three members and three deputies, all chosen by the Legislative Assembly for a period of three years from lists proposed by the Supreme Court and the executive branch. The 1962 constitution maintained the same structure. However, this structure was criticised as leading to electoral processes falling under the control of the executive branch, and led to accusations of political bias.

The constitution of 15 December 1983 changed the way that the Central Electoral Council was appointed; it stated that the three members of the Council would be chosen by the Legislative Assembly, with one each being chosen from slates proposed by the three political parties or coalitions with the largest vote share in the last presidential elections. This is the same set of procedures taken for the three political members of the Court today.

Civil War-era reforms 
In April 1991, during the negotiations between the government of El Salvador and the Farabundo Martí National Liberation Front to end the Salvadoran Civil War, an agreement was reached to reform various articles of the Constitution. One of these reforms was the conversion of the Central Electoral Council into the Supreme Electoral Court, and the addition of the two non-partisan members onto the makeup of the Court.

The first challenge the new Court faced was the 1994 Salvadoran general election. Whilst the International Foundation for Electoral Systems' observers found that "the El Salvador voting process was conducted in an orderly, peaceful and transparent fashion which permitted the popular will of the Salvadoran people to be expressed", concerns were also raised about the number of voter applications the Court rejected, often due to lack of documentation.

The IFES report also recommended that El Salvador institute a new unitary document for voter registration and identification, which it called at the time a Citizens Voting and Identification Document. Whilst efforts started towards this process in 1994, it was not until the 2004 elections that the Unique Identity Document substituted the previous electoral cards. The 2013 Electoral Code states that the Unique Identity Document forms the complete basis of the electoral register, and information on all citizens who own one is given to the Court to establish their voter registration.

Modern day 

In 2019, Dora Esmeralda Martínez de Barahona, was chosen as the first woman President of the Court, after being proposed by the Grand Alliance for National Unity.

In April 2020, the Court announced plans to continue the 2021 elections to schedule, with additional measures put in place to ensure voters and polling staff would not be put in danger by the coronavirus pandemic. It was announced in May 2020 that the Court would ask for an additional  to put these measures in place. This funding would be additional to the existing  approved by the Legislative Assembly for the 2021 elections.

References

External links
Original copy of the 1983 Constitution of El Salvador without amendments at the Miguel de Cervantes Virtual Library

El Salvador
Electoral courts
Elections in El Salvador
Government of El Salvador